Harry Abofs (April 14, 1948 – August 29, 1993) was a Canadian football running back, defensive back, and return specialist for multiple Canadian Football League teams in the early 1970s. He played high school football at Downsview High School in Toronto. After playing college football for Tennessee Tech, Abofs went on to play for the Toronto Argonauts, the Edmonton Eskimos, the BC Lions, and the Hamilton Tiger-Cats.

Abofs found some success as a running back in his rookie year with Toronto, averaging 4.8 yards per carry, but is best known for his role in the 59th Grey Cup. In the fourth quarter of the game with the Argonauts down 14–11, Abofs received a punt from the Calgary Stampeders.  In an effort to capture the wet ball, he accidentally kicked it out of bounds while reaching down. CFL rules state that when a ball is kicked out of bounds, possession goes to the opposing team, thus giving Calgary possession once again. Had Abofs knocked the ball out of bounds with his hand, Toronto would have had one last offensive series. Instead, Calgary ran out the clock and ultimately captured their first Grey Cup since 1948.

Abofs was later converted to a defensive back by the Edmonton Eskimos. After making three interceptions with the Eskimos in 1973, he continued in this role until his retirement from the CFL.

Abofs died by suicide on August 29, 1993.

Season statistics

References 

1948 births
1993 deaths
German emigrants to Canada
German players of American football
German players of Canadian football
American football halfbacks
American football defensive backs
Canadian football running backs
Canadian football defensive backs
Canadian football return specialists
Tennessee Tech Golden Eagles football players
Toronto Argonauts players
Edmonton Elks players
BC Lions players
Hamilton Tiger-Cats players
1993 suicides
Suicides in Canada